

1930

Non-circulating coins

1932

Non-circulating coins

Circulating coins

1933

Non-circulating coins

1934

Non-circulating coins

1935

Non-circulating coins

1936

Non-circulating coins

1937

Non-circulating coins

1938

Non-circulating coins

1939

Non-circulating coins

Notes 

  The George Washington Bicentennial half dollar was originally proposed as a traditional non-circulating commemorative coin.  However, President Herbert Hoover vetoed the proposal in 1930.
  The Washington quarter was originally intended to be struck in 1932 only.  The design was found to be popular with the public, and was produced again in 1934 (no quarters were struck in 1933).  The coin has been in production as a regular issue coin ever since, although the 1932 quarter is considered the only commemorative eagle reverse Washington quarter.
  The George Washington Bicentennial half dollar was again proposed as a circulation coin.  Washington was to appear on the half dollar for one year only in 1932.  However, due to the lack of demand because of the Great Depression, no half dollars were minted for circulation for three years from 1930 to 1932.  Washington quarters were struck instead.

References

Bibliography 

 

Commemorative coins of the United States